This is a list of Confederate government Civil War military units, not raised by any state.

Infantry
 1st Confederate Infantry (1st Confederate Regiment, Georgia Volunteers)
 2nd Confederate Infantry
 3rd Confederate Infantry (Marmaduke's 18th Arkansas Infantry Regiment, and additional Tennessee units)
 4th Confederate Infantry (1st Regiment, Alabama, Tennessee, and Mississippi Infantry)
 9th Confederate Infantry (5th Confederate Infantry; 5th Confederate Regiment, Tennessee Infantry)
 23rd Confederate Infantry (Alabama Volunteers)
 Bailey's Consolidated Regiment of Infantry
 Tucker's Confederate Regiment (also known as "1st Foreign Battalion"; "1st Foreign Legion":former Union prisoners of war)
 1st Battalion, Confederate Infantry (Forney's Regiment)
 8th Confederate Battalion (also known as "2nd Foreign Battalion"; "2nd Foreign Legion": former Union POWs)
 Brooks' Battalion, Confederate Regular Infantry (also known as "Brooks Foreign Battalion": former Union POWs)
 Haskell's Company, Infantry

Cavalry
 1st Confederate Cavalry
 1st Confederate Regular Cavalry
 3rd Confederate Cavalry
 7th Confederate Cavalry (Claiborne's Regiment, Partisan Rangers; 7th Regiment, Confederate Partisan Rangers)
 8th (Dearing's) Confederate Cavalry
 8th (Wade's) Confederate Cavalry (2nd Regiment, Mississippi and Alabama Cavalry)
 10th Confederate Cavalry
 14th Confederate Cavalry
 15th Confederate Cavalry (1st Regiment, Alabama and Florida Cavalry)
 16th Confederate Cavalry (12th Regiment Mississippi Cavalry, Armistead's Cavalry, Spence's Cavalry)
 20th Confederate Cavalry (Lay's Regiment, Confederate Cavalry)
 Powers' Regiment, Confederate Cavalry
 Wood's Regiment, Confederate Cavalry
 1st Battalion, Trans-Mississippi Confederate Cavalry (1st Battalion, Arkansas and Louisiana Cavalry)
 6th Battalion, Confederate Cavalry
 7th Battalion, Confederate Cavalry (Prentice's Battalion, Confederate Cavalry)
 Baxter's Battalion, Confederate Cavalry
 Cutshaw's Battalion, Confederate Artillery
 Clarkson's Battalion, Confederate Cavalry, Independent Rangers
 Murchison's Battalion, Cavalry
 Raum's Company, Confederate Cavalry (Warren Dragoons)

Indian cavalry
 1st Cherokee Mounted Rifles (1st Arkansas Cherokee Mounted Rifles)
 1st Cherokee Mounted Volunteers (Watie's Regiment, Cherokee Mounted Volunteers; 2nd Regiment, Cherokee Mounted Rifles, Arkansas; 1st Regiment, Cherokee Mounted Rifles or Riflemen)
 Cherokee Regiment (Special Service)
 1st Squadron, Cherokee Mounted Volunteers (Holt's Squadron, Cherokee Mounted Volunteers)
 2nd Cherokee Mounted Volunteers (2nd Regiment Cherokee Mounted Rifles or Riflemen)
 1st Chickasaw Infantry (Hunter's Regiment, Indian Volunteers)
 Shecoe's Chickasaw Battalion, Mounted Volunteers
 1st Choctaw and Chickasaw Mounted Rifles
 1st Choctaw Mounted Rifles
 Deneale's Regiment, Choctaw Warriors (Deneale's Confederate Volunteers)
 Wilkins' (Captain) Company, Choctaw Infantry
 1st Creek Mounted Volunteers (1st Regiment, Creek Mounted Rifles or Riflemen; Creek Regiment, Mounted Indian Volunteers; 2nd Regiment, Arkansas Creeks)
 2nd Creek Mounted Volunteers
 1st Osage Battalion, C.S.A.
 1st Seminole Mounted Volunteers
 Washington's Squadron of Indians, C.S.A. (Reserve Squadron of Cavalry)

Artillery
 Braxton's Battalion, Confederate Artillery (Battalion C, 2d Corps, Army of Northern Virginia)
 Cunningham's Battalion, Confederate Artillery
 Courtney's Battalion, Confederate Artillery
 Haskell's Battalion, Confederate Artillery
 Huger's Battalion, Confederate Artillery
 Lewis' Battalion, Confederate Artillery
 Martin's Battalion, Confederate Reserve Artillery
 McLaughlin's Battalion, Confederate Artillery
 McIntosh's Battalion, Confederate Artillery (Battalion C,
 Nelson's Battalion, Confederate Artillery (31st Battalion, Virginia Light Artillery; 3rd Battalion Reserve, Light Artillery)
 Page's Battalion, Confederate Artillery (Carter's Battalion of Artillery; Braxton's Battalion of Artillery) 
 Palmer's Battalion, Confederate Artillery (Robertson's Battalion of Artillery) 
 Poague's Battalion, Artillery

Light Artillery
 1st Regular Battery, Confederate Light Artillery (Semmes' Battery; Barnes' Battery)
 Davis' Company, Confederate Light Artillery
 Dent's Battery, Confederate Light Artillery
 Richardson's Battalion, Confederate Light Artillery (Battalion A. 1st Corps Artillery, Army of Northern Virginia)
 Stark's Battalion, Confederate Light Artillery (Battalion B. 1st Corps Artillery, Army of Northern Virginia)
Cobb's Battery 1st Kentucky Light Artillery (1st Kentucky Orphans Brigade, Army of Tennessee)

Heavy Artillery
 De Gournay's Battalion, Heavy Artillery (12th Battalion, Louisiana Heavy Artillery)
 Montague's Battalion, Confederate Heavy Artillery (4th Battalion, Confederate Heavy Artillery)
 Smith's Battalion, Confederate Heavy Artillery

Horse Artillery
 Marshall's Company, Confederate Artillery (Brown Horse Artillery)
 Stuart's Horse Artillery
 White's (Captain) Battery, Horse Artillery

Engineer
 1st Regiment, Confederate Engineer Troops
 2nd Regiment, Confederate Engineer Troops
 3rd Regiment, Confederate Engineer Troops
 4th Regiment, Confederate Engineer Troops

Misc
 Bands, C.S.A. 
 Bell's Battalion, C.S.A. 
 Brush Battalion, C.S.A.
 Burrough's Battalion, Partisan Rangers (Princess Anne Partisan Rangers) 
 Click's Company, Ordnance Scouts and Guards, C.S.A. 
 Confederate Infantry 
 Cunningham's Ordnance Detachment (Cuyler's Ordnance Detachment) 
 Davis' Company of Guides, C.S.A. 
 Engineers, C.S.A. 
 Exchanged Battalion, C.S.A. (Trans-Mississippi Battalion; Western Battalion)
 Gillum's Regiment (Henry Gillum's Regiment; Gillum's Regiment, Mounted Infantry; Gillum's Regiment, Mounted Riflemen) 
 Infantry School of Practice 
 Invalid Corps
 Jackson's Company, C.S.A. 
 Lyon's Escort, Forrest's Cavalry, C.S.A. 
 Madison's Company, Mounted Spies and Guides (Phillips' Mtd. Spies and Guides)
 Martin's Escort, C.S.A.
 McDaniel's (Captain) Company, Secret Service 
 Mead's Confederate Cavalry (Mead's Regiment of Partisan Rangers) 
 Miscellaneous Indian Records
 Nitre and Mining Bureau, War Department, C.S.A., 
 Ochiltree's Detachment of Recruits (Detachment of Regulars) 
 President's Guard, C.S.A.
 Reserve Corps Artillery, Army of Northern Virginia) 
 Sappers and Miners
 Signal Corps, C.S.A.
 Stirman's Regiment, Sharp Shooters
 Young's (5th) Company, Retributors

Scouts
 Blake's Scouts, C.S.A. 
 Bradford's Corps, Scouts and Guards (Bradford's Battalion)
 Forrest's Scouts, C.S.A.
 Fort's Scouts, C.S.A.
 Lillard's Company, Independent Scouts and Rangers (Nelson Rangers and Scouts)
 Wheeler's Scouts, C.S.A. (Hawkins' Scouts, C.S.A.; Carter's Scouts, C.S.A.; 1st Tennessee Mounted Scouts)

See also
List of American Civil War units by state

References 

Military units and formations of the Confederate States Army
Lists of military units and formations of the American Civil War